Area codes 336 and 743 are NANPA area codes that cover most of north-central and northwestern North Carolina, including the Piedmont Triad region and portions of the northern Foothills and northern Mountains. Area code 336 was split off from area code 910 on December 15, 1997. The 743 overlay area code officially entered service on October 24, 2015.

Cities within 336/743 area code 
This list includes only the larger communities and is not exhaustive. For cities with more than one ZIP code, only the central ZIP code is given.

 Archdale (27263)
 Asheboro (27203)
 Burlington (27215)
 Clemmons (27012)
 Eden (27288)
 Elkin (28621)
 Graham (27253)
 Greensboro (27401)
 High Point (27260)
 Kernersville (27284) 
 King (27021)
 Lewisville (27023)
 Lexington (27292)
 Madison (27025)
 Mayodan (27027)
 Mebane (27302)
 Mocksville (27028)
 Mount Airy (27030)
 Oak Ridge (27310)
 Pilot Mountain (27041)
 Reidsville (27320)
 Roxboro (27573)
 Rural Hall (27045)
 Sparta (28675)
 Stokesdale (27357)
 Summerfield (27358)
 Thomasville (27360)
 West Jefferson (28694)
 Wilkesboro (28697)
 Winston-Salem (27101)
 Yadkinville (27055)
 Yanceyville (27379)

Overlay
Officials from the North Carolina Utilities Commission announced on August 20, 2014, that 336 would be overlaid with a new area code, 743. The new area code would require 10-digit dialing for local calls, although no long-distance charges would be applied within the 336 territory. Those who already had 336 numbers kept them, easing the burden of having to change phone numbers.The new area code was to be used primarily for issuing new numbers, and was needed because 336 was projected to be exhausted sometime in 2016. The activation of 743 broke seven-digit dialing throughout the I-85 Corridor in North Carolina; Charlotte (704/980) and the Triangle (919/984) had already been overlaid. At the time, 336 was one of the few urbanized area codes without an overlay, making the Triad one of the few large metropolitan areas in the South where seven-digit dialing was still possible.

Permissive dialing began on October 24, 2015, and continued until April 23, 2016, when ten-digit dialing became mandatory. The first numbers with a 743 area code were issued in May 2016.

See also 
 List of North Carolina area codes

References

External links

 List of exchanges from AreaCodeDownload.com, 336 Area Code

336
336
Telecommunications-related introductions in 1997